Jon Owen (born late 20th century) is an American luge official who competed in the sport in the late 1980s. He is best known for becoming the first person to slide down the bobsleigh, luge, and skeleton track used for the 2002 Winter Olympics in January 1997 at the Park City, Utah venue.

Owen finished 23rd in the men's singles event at the 1988 Winter Olympics in Calgary. He later became a development coach for the U.S. Luge Team, and was honored as a development coach of the year by the United States Olympic Committee in 1996.

While a development coach for the U.S. team in Park City, Owen developed a luge sled for the disabled which was presented for use in 2010.

He serves as Western Regional Coordinator for USA Luge in Park City. In 2020 Owen coached Team USA Luge at the Lausanne Winter Youth Olympic Games.

References
1988 luge men's singles results (as Jonathan Owen)
United States Olympic Committee 2003 article on the debut of the luge sled for use by the disabled.
University of Southern California 1997 article on USOC Development Coaches of the Year, including Owen.
USALuge.org contact information, including Owen.
Utah Olympic Park track information featuring the first run by Owen

External links
 

American male lugers
Living people
Lugers at the 1988 Winter Olympics
Year of birth missing (living people)
People from Salt Lake County, Utah
Olympic lugers of the United States